The 1967 Bolivian Primera División, the first division of Bolivian football (soccer), was played by 6 teams. The champions was Jorge Wilstermann.

La Paz Group

Final Group

External links
 Official website of the LFPB 

Bolivian Primera División seasons
Bolivia
1967 in Bolivian sport